Marshall Hilary Medoff (January 8, 1945 in Chicago, Illinois—February 14, 2016) was an American economist who taught at California State University, Long Beach (CSULB) and the University of California, Irvine.

Education and career
Medoff received his B.S. from the Illinois Institute of Technology, his M.S. from the University of Illinois at Urbana-Champaign, and his Ph.D. from the University of California, Berkeley in 1973. He joined the faculty of CSULB in 1973, where he remained until he retired from there in 2012.

Research
Medoff published studies on multiple disparate topics in the field of economics, including abortion restrictions, gun control laws, and racial discrimination.

References

1945 births
2016 deaths
Economists from California
California State University, Long Beach faculty
Illinois Institute of Technology alumni
University of California, Berkeley alumni
University of Illinois Urbana-Champaign alumni
University of California, Irvine faculty